Ugly Beautiful is a 1996 album by Babybird, the band's sixth, though their first for Echo Records. Released on 21 October, the album includes the singles "Goodnight", "Candy Girl", "You're Gorgeous" and "Cornershop". "You're Gorgeous" was a surprise top-three UK and international hit for the group. The album was written entirely by band-leader Stephen Jones. Many of the songs were written and recorded by Jones alone between 1988 and 1994. Several of the songs had been released in these demo incarnations on Jones' solo lo-fi work as Baby Bird that he did prior to forming the band with John Pedder, Robert Gregory, Luke Scott and Huw Chadbourn. The majority of the album was produced by Jones with Steve Power. Darren Allison and Ian Caple each produced a song.

Release and reception

Ugly Beautiful received generally positive reviews. The Independent wrote, "It's not just that the songs sound less like dashed-off demos – there is also an increased depth of musical character to them, which renders them more like collective notions rather than the mad imaginings of a marginalised loner".

The album was released on CD, cassette and double-LP. US editions differ from international versions with "King Bing" substituted for "CFC". The album charted at number nine on the UK Albums Chart, number fifteen on the New Zealand Album Chart, and was certified Gold by the BPI. The artwork was designed by Stephen Jones and DED Associates with photography by Al Levy.

Track listing
All tracks written and composed by Stephen Jones.
 "Goodnight" – 2:53
 "Candy Girl" – 3:56
 "Jesus Is My Girlfriend" – 5:24
 "I Didn't Want to Wake You Up" – 5:15
 "Dead Bird Sings" – 5:11
 "Atomic Soda" – 5:08
 "You're Gorgeous" – 3:42
 "Bad Shave 2" – 3:27
 "Cornershop" – 3:48
 "King Bing" – 9:53
 "You & Me" – 4:10
 "45 & Fat" – 4:11
 "Too Handsome to Be Homeless" – 4:44
 "July" – 3:46
 "Baby Bird" – 5:01

US release
The US release substitutes "King Bing" for "CFC".

 "Goodnight" – 2:53
 "Candy Girl" – 3:57
 "Jesus Is My Girlfriend" – 5:24
 "I Didn't Want to Wake You Up" – 5:15
 "Dead Bird Sings" – 4:24
 "Atomic Soda" – 5:08
 "You're Gorgeous" – 3:42
 "Bad Shave" – 4:39
 "Cornershop" – 3:48
 "You & Me" – 4:09
 "45 & Fat" – 4:13
 "Too Handsome to Be Homeless" – 4:44
 "CFC" – 3:42
 "July" – 3:47
 "Baby Bird" – 5:00

Personnel
The following credits are adapted from the CD liner notes.

Ugly Beautiful was made by John Pedder, Robert Gregory, Stephen Jones, Luke Scott and Huw Chadbourn.
Stephen Jones – all instruments (tracks 3, 6, 9, 11)
Matt Hay – viola (track 5)
Stephen Jones and Steve Power – co-producer (all tracks except 3, 6, 8, 9, 11)
Stephen Jones – producer (tracks 3, 6 10)
Stephen Jones and Darren Allison – producer (track 8)
Ian Caple – producer (track 9)
Darren Allison – mixing (track 13)
Matt Hay – mixing (tracks 3 and 6)
Stephen Jones and DED Associates – artwork
Al Levy – photography
John Pedder and DED Associates – egg (graphics)
Douglas Cape – band photography

Charts

Certifications

References

External links
Ugly Beautiful (US) at Discogs.com

Babybird albums
1996 albums
The Echo Label albums